Matteo Negrini (born 21 December 1982) is an Italian footballer who played in the last two season for Italian fourth division club Alessandria.

Biography

Early career
Born in Lugo, Romagna, Negrini started his career at Eccellenza Emilia–Romagna club Argentana. In 2003, he was signed by Imolese for 2003–04 Serie C2, also an Emilia–Romagna team. In 2005, he moved back to the Province of Ferrara (where Argentana is located) for SPAL of the provincial capital.

Empoli
In July 2006 Negrini was signed by Serie A club Empoli F.C. Negrini was loaned to Massese, another Tuscan team, for 2006–07 Serie C1. On 1 August 2007 Negrini moved to Pro Patria for 2007–08 Serie C1. Empoli relegated in 2008, Negrini returned to the club in July but only played 3 times in 2008–09 Serie B. In January 2010 Negrini transferred to Ternana. He only played 8 times in 2009–10 Lega Pro Prima Divisione.

Alessandria
Negrini was signed by Alessandria in July 2010.

References

External links
 Football.it Profile 

Italian footballers
Serie B players
S.P.A.L. players
Empoli F.C. players
U.S. Massese 1919 players
Aurora Pro Patria 1919 players
Ternana Calcio players
U.S. Alessandria Calcio 1912 players
Association football midfielders
Sportspeople from the Province of Ravenna
1982 births
Living people
Footballers from Emilia-Romagna